Luca Ippoliti (born 31 October 1979), is an Italian futsal player who plays for Lazio as an Ala.

Honours
 Serie A: (1) 1999
 Coppa Italia: (2) 2003, 2011
 UEFA Futsal Championship: (1) 2003

References

External links
UEFA profile
Divisione C5 profile

1979 births
Living people
People from Marino, Lazio
Italian men's futsal players
S.S. Lazio Calcio a 5 players
Sportspeople from the Metropolitan City of Rome Capital